Pothyne formosana is a species of beetle in the family Cerambycidae. It was described by Schwarzer in 1925.

References

formosana
Beetles described in 1925